"Negro y Azul" (Spanish for "Black and Blue") is the seventh episode of the second season of the American television drama series Breaking Bad. It was written by John Shiban and directed by Felix Alcala.

Plot 
The episode opens with the band Los Cuates de Sinaloa performing a song called  "Negro y Azul" ("Black and Blue"), which is about how a gringo boss named Heisenberg is disrespecting the Mexican drug cartel by cornering the Albuquerque market with high-quality blue crystal methamphetamine. The song is a narcocorrido performed as a Norteño's Sierreño style, referencing the show's Neo-Western and New Mexico setting.

Walt has trouble getting in touch with Jesse and goes to his apartment. Jesse has been staying inside and smoking marijuana since witnessing Spooge's murder.  Walt is at first horrified that someone was murdered but calms down upon learning that nobody can identify Jesse. Badger calls to set up a deal. Walt is forced to meet Jesse's dealers and learns they are now afraid of Jesse following a rumor that he killed Spooge. Walt uses Jesse's new underworld reputation to galvanize him into helping expand their operation.

Hank is having trouble fitting in at the DEA office in El Paso, Texas, where his sense of humor is not appreciated and his coworkers do not respect him, partly because he is not fluent in Spanish. At a meeting with a cartel informant nicknamed "Tortuga", Hank loses his patience with the man's demands and his apparent disrespect. Some days later, while waiting for a meeting in the desert, Hank spots a message from the cartels: Tortuga's severed head mounted on top of a tortoise. Sickened by the grotesque display, Hank moves away from the tortoise. Doing so saves his life when a bomb strapped to the tortoise goes off.

Due to financial constraints, Skyler goes to her old company to apply for an entry-level job. She meets with her old friend and boss, Ted Beneke, who has taken over the company after his father's death. He decides to give Skyler her old job in the accounting department. Walt is concerned over Skyler's health at the workplace, especially since she originally left due to health problems from the company's manufacturing. There is obvious sexual tension between Skyler and Beneke; he reveals that he recently separated from his wife, the mother of his two children.

Jesse sees his landlady, Jane Margolis, drawing on their front steps, and connects with her over their love of art. However, he is recognized by a passing motorcyclist who has heard of his reputation, and it is revealed that he lied to her about his name. After he later admits to lying to her, she says that she doesn't care what he does as long as he doesn't do it at the house. He invites her inside to watch TV, even though he can't get his new television working. She holds his hand as they stare at the blank television.

Title meaning 

 "Negro y Azul" (pronounced [ˈne.ɣɾo i aˈsul]) is Spanish for "Black and Blue." "Black and Blue" was later the title of an episode of the Breaking Bad spinoff Better Call Saul.

Critical reception 
The episode received critical praise. Seth Amitin, writing for IGN, gave the episode a 9.3/10, commenting: "This was one of the better episodes this season and now we've only just dipped our toes into the deep end."

In 2019, The Ringer ranked "Negro y Azul" as the 36th best out of the 62 total Breaking Bad episodes.

Production 
The episode was written by John Shiban, and directed by Felix Alcala. It aired on AMC in the United States and Canada on April 19, 2009.

Notes

References

External links 
"Negro y Azul" at the official Breaking Bad site

2009 American television episodes
Breaking Bad (season 2) episodes